

Group A

Head coach:  Eduardo Rivero Aviles

Head coach:  Glenn Myernick

Head coach:  Samuel Arday

Head coach:  Tamotsu Matsuda

Group B

Head coach:  José Pekerman

Head coach:  Rui Caçador

Head coach:  Armando Rodríguez Chacon

Head coach:  Chérif Souleymane

Group C

Head coach:  Sebastian Brodrick

Head coach:  David McKay

Head coach:  Les Scheinflug

Head coach:  Juan Santisteban

Group D

Head coach:  António José Fernandes Barroso

Head coach:  Bernd Stöber

Head coach:  George Smith

Head coach:  Tony Taylor

External links
Squads at fifa.com

Fifa U-17 World Championship Squads, 1995
FIFA U-17 World Cup squads